The Hanjin Group is a South Korean chaebol. The group has various industries covered from transportation and airlines to hotels, tourism, and airport businesses, and one of the largest chaebols in Korea. The group includes Korean Air (KAL), which was acquired by the founder Cho Choong-hoon in 1969, and was the owner of Hanjin Shipping (once the largest shipping company in Korea) before its bankruptcy. In 2013, Hanjin Group officially switched from cross ownership to a holding company structure with the establishment of Hanjin KAL Corporation. The group is controlled by descendants of Cho Choong-hoon, and many construction chaebols are the major shareholders of Hanjin KAL.

History

Hanjin started at the end of World War II, in November 1945. Early on, its biggest customer was the U.S. Army, providing the transportation of material to both Korea and Vietnam. The company signed a major contract with the US 8th Army in November 1956, and another contract in March 1966, with all of the U.S. armed forces in Vietnam, including the Army, Navy, and Air Force. In November 1969, Hanjin made its entry into the containerized shipping business signing a deal with Sea-Land Service, Inc. In September 1970, the company opened its first container yard at the port of Busan.

The late 1970s saw a major push into the Middle East with contracts signed to Kuwait at the port of Shuwaik (September 1977), Saudi Arabia at the port of Dammam (March 1979), and at the port of Jeddah (May 1980).

In March 1990, Hanjin branched out into trucking and warehousing with the purchase of Korea Freight Transport Company. In June 1992, Hanjin Express was introduced to deliver small packages and provide courier service. The company started to load and unload cargo at the ports of Long Beach and Seattle with the joint venture Total Terminals International LLC., in August 1992. In January 1993, they initiated container rail service between Pusan and Uiwang. In May 1995, Hanjin hauled grain to North Korea. The Hanjin-Senator once was the seventh largest container transportation and shipping company in the world (operations ceased February 2009).

After Hanjin's founder, Cho Choong-hoon, died in 2002, his eldest son, Cho Yang-ho, inherited KAL, when his third son, Cho Soo-ho, was handed Hanjin Shipping. Cho Soo-ho died from lung cancer in 2006 and his widow, Choi Eun-young, became the chairwoman of Hanjin Shipping in the following year. KAL acquired 33.2 percent of Hanjin Shipping in June 2014.

On 31 August 2016, Hanjin Shipping filed for bankruptcy. Hanjin Shipping's creditors withdrew their support after deeming a funding plan by parent company Hanjin inadequate.

Listed subsidiaries
 Korean Air Co., LTD (KRX : 003490)
 Hanjin Transportation Co., LTD (KRX : 005430)
 Korea Airport Service Co., LTD (KRX : 002320)
 Jin Air Co., LTD (KRX : 272450)

Other subsidiaries

 JungSeok Enterprise Co., Ltd
 Hanjin Travel Service Co., Ltd
 Hanjin Transportation Co., Ltd
 Hanjin Information Systems & Telecommunication Co., Ltd (HIST)
 Total Passenger Service System Co., Ltd
 KAL Hotel Network Co., Ltd
 Air Total Service Co., Ltd
 CyberSky Co., Ltd
 Global Logistics System Korea Co., Ltd
 Homeo Therapy
 Jungseok-Inha School's Foundation
 Korea Aerospace University
 Jungseok Education Foundation
 Il Woo Foundation
 Uniconverse Co., Ltd

See also

 List of largest companies of South Korea

References

External links
 Hanjin website 
 Hanjin website 

 
Chaebol
Companies based in Seoul
Multinational companies headquartered in South Korea
Transport companies established in 1945
1945 establishments in Korea
South Korean brands
SkyTeam